Pterolophia postfasciculata is a species of beetle in the family Cerambycidae. It was described by Maurice Pic in 1934. It is known from China.

References

postfasciculata
Beetles described in 1934